Jaksa can be referred to:

 Jaksa, legendary ruler of White Serbia, son of Leszko III
 Jaksa Gryfita, crusader and magnate in Lesser Poland
 Jaksa of Köpenick, prince of the West Slavic Sprevani
 Jakša, Duke in the Serbian Despotate
 Jaksa, a nickname for the Sudanese footballer Nasr Eddin Abbas